PopCap Games, Inc. is an American video game developer based in Seattle, and a subsidiary of Electronic Arts. The company was founded in 2000 by John Vechey, Brian Fiete and Jason Kapalka.

Originally founded under the name "Sexy Action Cool", their first title was a strip poker game that served as a revenue stream for future titles. PopCap has developed several games for computers, consoles and mobile devices, with their most popular games being Bejeweled and Plants vs. Zombies games. PopCap was sold to Electronic Arts in 2011.

History 

PopCap Games was founded by John Vechey, Brian Fiete and Jason Kapalka in 2000. They originally incorporated as "Sexy Action Cool", a phrase taken from a poster of Desperado. Their first title was a strip poker game called "Foxy Poker" and was supposed to serve as a revenue stream for their future titles.

Their first game as PopCap was Bejeweled, a gem-swapping game, which was supported on all major platforms and awarded by Computer Gaming World Hall Of Fame in 2002. The company expanded in 2005 with the acquisition of Sprout Games, a Seattle-based casual games developer company like PopCap Games, founded by James Gwertzman. Sprout Games is the creator of the game Feeding Frenzy. The Sprout team helped PopCap to make a sequel to the game, Feeding Frenzy 2: Shipwreck Showdown, with Gwertzman becoming the Director of Business Development at PopCap. In early 2006, PopCap International was opened, based in Dublin, Ireland, working on product localization, mobile games development, marketing, sales and business development.

PopCap began another round of expansion in July 2007 by buying other casual game developers including the creators of an online consumer portal, SpinTop Games. One week prior, the company acquired the Chicago-based development house Retro64, founded by Mike Boeh, which is best known for their retro-arcade action and puzzle titles. After these acquisitions, the PopCap logo was rebranded, dropping the "Games" portion. PopCap's premium games list on their website are mixed with other games from other developers/distributors. PopCap hosted several games on PopCap.com and other websites, online and premium, until 2014, when they stopped offering games from their site.

On April 5, 2011, PopCap announced the creation of a new subsidiary, 4th and Battery, started in order to create "edgier" games. Their first creation was the game Unpleasant Horse. On July 12, 2011, Electronic Arts announced it was acquiring PopCap for $650 million with an additional $100 million stock option.

On August 21, 2012, PopCap laid off 50 employees in North America in a move to address a shift to mobile and free-to-play games and evaluated ceasing operations of its Dublin studio. The Dublin studio was closed on September 24, 2012.

Games developed 

PopCap has developed over 50 games over the past 20 years. Games developed by PopCap include Bejeweled, Plants vs. Zombies, Peggle, and Bookworm.

Bejeweled 
Bejeweled is a series of tile-matching puzzle video games created by PopCap Games. Bejeweled was released initially for browsers in 2001, followed by five sequels: Bejeweled 2 (2004), Bejeweled Twist (2008), Bejeweled Blitz (2009), Bejeweled 3 (2010), Bejeweled Stars (2016) and more, all by PopCap Games and its parent, Electronic Arts.

Plants vs Zombies 

Plants vs. Zombies is a tower defense and strategy video game developed and originally published by PopCap Games for Windows and OS X in May 2009, and ported to consoles, handhelds, mobile devices, and remastered versions for personal computers.

Peggle 

Peggle is a series of casual puzzle video games created by PopCap Games. Peggle was released initially for desktop in 2007, followed by three sequels: Peggle Nights (2008), Peggle 2 (2013), and Peggle Blast (2014).

References

External links 
 

2000 establishments in Washington (state)
2011 mergers and acquisitions
American companies established in 2000
Companies based in Seattle
Electronic Arts

Video game companies established in 2000
Video game development companies